Juan Carlos Ferrero defeated Carlos Moyá in the final, 7–5, 6–3, 6–4 to win the singles tennis title at the 2002 Monte Carlo Masters.

Gustavo Kuerten was the reigning champion, but did not compete that year.

Seeds
A champion seed is indicated in bold text while text in italics indicates the round in which that seed was eliminated.

Draw

Finals

Top half

Section 1

Section 2

Bottom half

Section 3

Section 4

External links
 2002 Monte Carlo Masters Draw

2002 Monte Carlo Masters
Singles